Gregory L. DiDonato (born July 28, 1963) of Dennison, Ohio, is an American politician of the Democratic party.  While still in high school, DiDonato was elected to the village council of Dennison, Ohio. At age 21, he was elected mayor of the Village of Dennison. He was re-elected mayor in 1987. While in college, he worked as a baker. Afterwards, he worked for a grocery distribution company. In 1990, DiDonato won a seat in the Ohio House of Representatives, serving the 97th district. In 1994, DiDonato was the Democratic nominee for a seat in the United States House of Representatives to replace retiring Democratic incumbent Douglas Applegate. DiDonato lost that race to Robert W. Ney. He was minority leader of the Ohio State Senate. He served as a delegate for John Edwards on the Ohio delegation to the 2004 Democratic National Convention in Boston. DiDonato was elected to the Ohio Senate in 1996. His most recent term ended in January 2005. He was prevented by Ohio's term limits law from seeking a third consecutive term in the Senate. DiDonato was again elected as mayor of Dennison, Ohio in 2007. He stepped down to become the chairman of Tuscarawas County Democratic Party. DiDonato once again currently serves as the Mayor of Dennison.

DiDonato currently serves as the executive director of the Ohio Mid-Eastern Governments Association (OMEGA).

See also
Election Results, U.S. Representative from Ohio, 18th District

References

Living people
Democratic Party Ohio state senators
Democratic Party members of the Ohio House of Representatives
Mayors of places in Ohio
People from Dennison, Ohio
1963 births
21st-century American politicians